Doorawarrah Station, commonly referred to as Doorawarrah, is a pastoral lease that operates as a cattle station in Western Australia.

Doorawarrah is bounded to the west by Brick House Station and has  of double frontage to the Gascoyne River.

In 1890 the property was acquired by James Munro, who developed the property over many years.

In 1905 approximately 32,000 sheep were shorn at Doorawarrah. By 1908 the flock size had increased to 36,368, and 558 bales of wool were produced from shearing. 42,459 sheep were clipped in 1910, yielding 768 bales. The area had three dry years from mid 1909 to early 1913, with the Gascoyne River not running for any of that time.

Munro sold Doorawarrah and took up the Pallinup Estate near Gnowangerup. Reginald George Burt who had once managed neighbouring Brick House Station acquired Doorawarrah and the 33,000 sheep the property was stocked with in 1922 and retained possession until his death in 1957.

Massive bushfires swept through the area in 1927, with Doorawarrah, Brick House, Ella Valla, Callagiddy and other properties all losing large areas of feed to the fires.

The  property was sold for 3 million in 2009 to a local pastoralist who owned two other properties in the area. The new owners, David and Geneveive Robinson, lost a few cattle from the property during the 2010 floods, but had a good season in 2011 after the rains broke a long drought.

Doorawarrah and other stations such as Jimba Jimba, Boolathana and Meedo all received bushfire advice warnings.

See also
 List of pastoral leases in Western Australia

References

Stations (Australian agriculture)
Pastoral leases in Western Australia
Shire of Carnarvon